Virginia Bank and Trust Building, also known as the Auslew Gallery Building, is a historic bank building located at Norfolk, Virginia. It was designed by the architectural firm of Wyatt & Nolting and built in 1908–1909.  It is a four-story, Beaux Arts style building.  It features  Doric order and Ionic order engaged columns and pilasters.

It was listed on the National Register of Historic Places in 1984.

References

Bank buildings on the National Register of Historic Places in Virginia
Beaux-Arts architecture in Virginia
Commercial buildings completed in 1909
Buildings and structures in Norfolk, Virginia
National Register of Historic Places in Norfolk, Virginia